Gastón Yabale (born 30 September 1994) is an Argentine professional footballer who plays as a centre-back for Gimnasia Jujuy.

Career
Yabale joined the academy of Deportivo Lasallano in 2002, having signed from Colegio La Salle. He remained up until 2011 when he made his senior bow in Liga Cordobesa for the club. In 2015, Yabale signed with Instituto. Having been on the substitutes bench for a Copa Argentina loss to Gimnasia y Esgrima in August 2016, Yabale's debut subsequently arrived in September during a draw with San Martín in Primera B Nacional. He made thirty appearances in the 2016–17 season, which included his opening goal against Los Andes but also the first two red cards of his Instituto career versus Douglas Haig and Brown.

Personal life
Yabale is the nephew of Armando Pérez, a former president of Belgrano who also worked within the AFA. Away from football, he studied at the Catholic University of Córdoba. In 2018, Yabale received a degree in business administration.

Career statistics
.

References

External links

1994 births
Living people
Footballers from Córdoba, Argentina
Argentine footballers
Association football defenders
Primera Nacional players
Instituto footballers
Gimnasia y Esgrima de Jujuy footballers